Mibamwe II Sekarongoro II Gisanura was  Mwami (King) of the Kingdom of Rwanda between 1609 and 1642.

References

17th-century monarchs in Africa
Rwandan kings
1642 deaths